Tomb of Vijaya is an ancient monument, situated on the hillock of Medagama Kanda, Panduwasnuwara DS in Sri Lanka. The monument site consists of a stupa shaped circular structure which is traditionally believed to be the tomb of King Vijaya (543–505 BCE), the first recorded ruler of Sri Lanka. In 2007 the monument was formally recognised by the Government as a protected archaeological site in Sri Lanka.

The site was in a state of ruin before it was discovered by the Sri Lankan Department of Archaeology. During the excavation, archaeologists found some ashes placed inside the structure and carried out radiocarbon dating for them. According to the results the ashes are about 2,500–2,600 years old. In 1986, the Department of Archaeology conserved this structure as a protected monument and their investigations disclosed that the present brick monument belongs to the 10th century since the curvilinear bricks of the kot-karalla have some writing in Sinhala script from the 10th century on them.

References

External links

 
විජය සොහොන නිකසළා නුවරද? (In Sinhala)
මැදගම කඳු පාමුල ඓතිහාසික පිංබිම නිකසලා නුවර පුරාණ විහාරය (In Sinhala), Divaina

Archaeological protected monuments in Kurunegala District